A tabernacle or sacrament house is a fixed, locked box in which the Eucharist (consecrated communion hosts) is stored as part of the "reserved sacrament" rite. A container for the same purpose, which is set directly into a wall, is called an aumbry.

Within Catholicism, Eastern Orthodoxy, and in some traditions of Anglicanism and Lutheranism, the tabernacle is a box-like or dome-like vessel for the exclusive reservation of the consecrated Eucharist. It is normally made from precious metals, stone or wood, and is lockable and secured to the altar or adjacent wall to prevent the consecrated elements within from being removed without authorization. These denominations believe that the Eucharist contains the real presence of Jesus, and thus use the term tabernacle, a word referring to the Old Testament tabernacle, which was the locus of God's presence among the Jewish people.

The "reserved Eucharist" is secured in the tabernacle for distribution at services, for use when bringing Holy Communion to the sick, and, in the Western Church, as a focal point for reflection, meditation and prayer. Until the very late 20th century, it was required that the Christian tabernacle be covered with a tent-like veil (conopaeum) or have curtains across its door when the Eucharist is present within. Although this is no longer required in the 21st century, it continues to be the tradition in many places.

By way of metaphor, Catholics and Orthodox alike also refer to the Blessed Virgin Mary as the tabernacle in their devotions (such as the Akathist hymn or Catholic Litanies to Mary) since as Theotokos, the Mother of God, she carried within her the body of Christ.

History

In Antiquity 
In early Christianity, priests delivered bread consecrated at their Eucharist to the homes of the sick and others unable to attend the celebration. Laypeople were sometimes commissioned for this purpose. When the Edict of Milan ended persecution and the early Church was allowed to practise its religion publicly, the Eucharist was no longer safeguarded in private Christian homes, but was instead reserved near the altars of churches.

At this time, the preferred containers or "tabernacles" had the form of a dove within a tower. The dove was typically gold, and the tower silver. Emperor Constantine gave to Saint Peter's Basilica in Rome, a gift of two such vessels, both gold and adorned with 250 white pearls. Similar vessels of silver towers and golden doves were also given to particular churches by Pope Innocent I and Pope Hilarius.

Later on, simpler vessels would also be used in place of the dove and tower.

Middle Ages 
By the 13th century, the Eucharist was most often kept in a highly embellished cabinet inserted into the wall to the right or left of the altar. The lit altar lamp indicated the presence of Christ. This was in accordance with the 1215 Fourth Lateran Council, which decreed that the reserved sacrament be kept in a locked receptacle.

The construction of ceremonial stone containers for the Eucharist began in the late 14th century, largely in northern Europe. German examples of this are found in the church of St. Lawrence in Nuremberg, the Minster of Salem, Saints Peter and Paul City Church in Weil der Stadt (over ), the Church of Our Lady in Lübeck, and St. Mary's Cathedral in Fürstenwalde upon Spree. Belgian churches with such sacrament towers include St. Catherine's in Zuurbemde, St. Martin's in Kortrijk, St. Peter's and St. James's in Leuven, St. James's in Bruges and St. Leonard's in Zoutleeuw.

The Renaissance 
In the early 16th century, Bishop Matteo Giberti enacted edicts through the Diocese of Verona which proclaimed that the container for the consecrated bread should be placed on the altar. The custom then spread throughout northern Italy. Saint Charles Borromeo, who became Archbishop of Milan in 1560, had the sacrament moved from the sacristy to the altar (though not the main altar) of his cathedral. The edition of the Roman Missal revised and promulgated by Pope Pius V in 1570 (see Tridentine Mass) still did not envisage placing the tabernacle on an altar: it decreed that the altar card, containing some of the principal prayers of the Mass, should rest against a cross placed midway on the altar. However, in 1614 Pope Paul V imposed on the churches of his diocese of Rome the rule of putting the tabernacle on an altar. In reaction to Protestantism's denial of the reality and permanence of the Real Presence of Christ, it became the practice to place the tabernacle in conspicuous places such as the high altar, making it more visible. Whether on the main altar of the church or in a special chapel, the tabernacle became larger and more ornate, eventually becoming the focal point wherever it was placed.

Present day

Catholic Church

The Catholic Church holds to the doctrine of transubstantiation which holds to the belief that the body and blood of Christ continue to be present in the bread and wine even after Mass is concluded. Therefore, a tabernacle serves as a secure and sacred place in which to store the Blessed Sacrament for carrying to the sick and others who cannot participate in Mass, or as a focus for the prayers of those who visit the church.

The renewal of the Roman-rite liturgy following the Second Vatican Council (see Mass of Paul VI) highlighted the primacy of the Eucharistic celebration. This liturgical renewal determined that the altar should be "truly the centre to which the attention of the whole congregation of the faithful naturally turns". Before Vatican II, Mass was often celebrated directly in front of the tabernacle. After Vatican II the altar for the celebration of Mass now stands on its own, and the tabernacle is given its own, usually smaller altar, or is placed on a nearby pedestal or in its own separate chapel. This allows the faithful to focus on the celebration of the Eucharistic action during Mass while providing the tabernacle with a place that fosters prayer and meditation outside of Mass.

The same Instruction lays down that:

Tabernacles have generally been made of metal (such as bronze or brass), or sometimes of heavy wood. They are traditionally lined in white cloth (often silk), and are always securely lockable and affixed or bolted to a support structure. Some tabernacles are veiled when the Eucharist is present in them. These veils are often made of a cloth in the liturgical colour of the day or season, thus matching the priest's vestments.

Communion for the sick – Catholic Rite
There is no separate place for consecrated hosts to be distributed at Mass and those used for the homebound and sick. All consecrated hosts are kept in the ciborium inside the tabernacle. When bringing Communion to the homebound or sick, a small to medium-sized receptacle called a pyx is used by lay ministers, deacons and priests. Most are made from pewter with designs ranging from plain to very ornate and come in varying sizes, depending upon how many consecrated hosts one will need. The pyx is usually carried in a protective case made out of leather called a burse. Most burses have a long, string-like strap that can be worn around the neck.

Catholics only administer the consecrated hosts outside of the church. Priests have both a home Mass kit and a "sick call" kit. These come in carrying cases with a handle and vary in size, depending upon what is needed. A sick call kit comes with a small vial filled with the Oil of the Sick for administering the Sacrament of the Sick along with the pyx for administering Communion, crucifix, prayer book, perhaps a vestment called a "stole" for administering the Sacrament of Reconciliation (Confession) and any other items deemed essential by the priest. The anointing of the sick and confession are the two Sacraments of Healing in the Catholic Church.

Per the Church's teaching, it is inappropriate for a person to take the consecrated hosts into the home with them. After all sick calls have been made, the consecrated hosts are to be returned to the ciborium located inside the tabernacle.

Eastern Catholic and Orthodox churches

Reserved sacrament

In the Eastern Orthodox Church, the Holy Mysteries (reserved sacrament) are kept in a tabernacle or ark on the altar at all times. The tabernacle is normally wrought of gold, silver, or wood and elaborately decorated. It is often shaped like a miniature church building, and usually has a cross on top of it. It may be opened using small doors, or a drawer that pulls out. Some churches keep the tabernacle under a glass dome to protect it and the Holy Mysteries it contains from dust and changes in humidity.

The Orthodox do not observe Eucharistic adoration as a devotion separate from the reception of Holy Communion. However, the real presence of the body and blood of Christ requires the Holy Mysteries to be respected. The clergy must be vested whenever they handle the tabernacle. During the Liturgy of the Presanctified Gifts (wherein Communion is received from the reserved Sacrament), when the consecrated Holy Mysteries are brought out during the Great Entrance, everyone makes a full prostration—even the chanters stop singing and prostrate themselves while the entrance is made in silence.

When Orthodox Christians receive Holy Communion, they always receive both the body and the blood of Christ. This includes Communion taken to the sick. Therefore, both are reserved in the tabernacle. Every year on Holy Thursday, the reserved Mysteries are renewed. The priest will cut an extra Lamb (host) for that liturgy and after the consecration, just before the clergy receive communion, the priest will take the extra host and carefully pour a little of the blood of Christ over it. This host will then be cut into very small portions, allowed to dry thoroughly and placed in the tabernacle. The deacon (or priest, if there is no deacon) will consume whatever remains of the previous year's reserved sacrament when he performs the ablutions.

Typically, a sanctuary lamp is kept burning in the Holy Place (Sanctuary) when the Mysteries are reserved. This may be a separate lamp hanging from the ceiling, or it may be the top lamp of the seven-branch candlestick which sits either on top of the Holy Table or behind it.

Communion for the sick – Orthodox and Eastern Rite

The receptacle for taking communion to the sick is also called a pyx. However, it is quite different from those used by Catholics, Anglicans and Lutherans. The pyx used by Western Rite Christians is a flat, circular container made to hold only consecrated hosts. The pyxides used in the Orthodox and Eastern Rites are designed for much more, and they, too, vary in size and designs may differ. They also may have a metal case with a chain attached so it can be hung around the neck. Inside the case are several compartments. One compartment contains a small box with a tightly fitting lid into which some of the reserved Holy Mysteries will be placed. There is also a place for a very small chalice, just enough to hold a small amount of wine and a particle of the reserved Mysteries. There will be a small bottle to hold ordinary wine (not consecrated) which is used to soften the particle before it is consumed, and a small pair of tweezers with which the priest removes a particle of the Mysteries from the box to place it in the chalice without touching it, and finally, a small communion spoon with which to administer Holy Communion. This sick call kit is normally kept on the Holy Table, or sometimes on the Table of Oblation.

Rather than using a kit like the one described above, a priest may use a small chalice with a tight-fitting lid. He pours a little wine into the chalice, places a particle of the reserved Mysteries in the wine, and attaches the lid. He will take the chalice and a communion spoon to administer Holy Communion to the sick.

Presanctified gifts
A smaller tabernacle sometimes referred to as a pyx, is used during Great Lent. It may be a rectangular, gold-plated box, often with a cross on top, and with a hinged lid. On Sundays during Great Lent, the priest will consecrate extra hosts (in the same manner as on Holy Thursday), for use during the Presanctified Liturgy. These hosts will be kept in the pyx on the Holy Table, or sometimes on the Prothesis (Table of Oblation).

Lutheran churches

Reservation of the blessed sacrament is permitted in the Lutheran Churches, although not for the purposes of Eucharistic adoration. In Lutheran parishes that practice sacramental reservation, a chancel lamp is kept near the tabernacle or aumbry.

The now-defunct Evangelical Catholic Church, a Lutheran denomination of Evangelical Catholic, taught:

Anglican and Episcopal churches
Only some Anglican parishes of Anglo-Catholic churchmanship use tabernacles, either fixed on the altar, placed behind or above it or off to one side. As in Catholic churches, the presence of the reserved sacrament is indicated by a "presence lamp" – an oil or wax-based flame in a clear glass vessel placed close to the tabernacle. Normally, only ciboria and Blessed Sacrament are placed in the tabernacle, although it is not uncommon for the wine or consecrated oils to be placed there as well. When the tabernacle is vacant, it is common practice to leave it open so that the faithful will not inadvertently perform an act of devotion (such as bowing or genuflecting). Tabernacles are customarily lined with, if not constructed from, cedar wood, whose aromatic qualities discourage insect life.

E. J. Bicknell in A Theological Introduction to the Thirty-Nine Articles writes that "According to the first Prayer-Book of Edward VI the sick might be communicated with the reserved sacrament on the same day as a celebration in church." Article XXVIII — Of the Lord's Supper in Anglicanism's 39 Articles and Article XVIII — Of the Lord's Supper in Methodism's Articles of Religion state that "The Sacrament of the Lord's Supper was not by Christ's ordinance reserved, carried about, lifted up, or worshipped." The Rev. Jonathan A. Michigan, founder of The Conciliar Anglican writes that this Article "does not explicitly ban these practices but does add a note of caution about them by pointing to the fact that none of them is biblical." As such, the reserved sacrament was used by Anglican priests who held these views to administer communion to persons unable to attend church through illness. However, in 1885 the upper house of Convocation ruled against this practice, declaring "the practice of reservation is contrary to the wise and carefully revised Order of the Church of England".

Among those Anglicans who identify as "Anglo-Catholics," the Protestant Reformation is often considered one episode in church history that no longer defines their faith as Anglicans. After the Oxford Movement, reservation became commonplace in large parts of the Anglican Communion, and some parishes also perform services of solemn benediction and/or other forms of Eucharistic adoration.

The Anglo-Catholic manual of rites and ceremonies Ritual Notes described tabernacles as generally made of wood. They could however, be made of gold, silver or even iron (if the iron is enclosed in gilt-wood, wrought metal or carved stone). If the material is metal there should be an inner lining of poplar or cedar wood which also has a lining of white silk or cloth of gold or silver. The veil may be white or varying in liturgical colour. There may be a second tabernacle but not more than one can be in use at the same time. A lamp should remain lit nearby when the tabernacle is in use.

See also 

First Thursdays Devotion
Tabernacle (Methodist)
Tabernacle (LDS Church)

References

Bibliography

Further reading
Freestone, W. H. (1917) The Sacrament Reserved. (Alcuin Club Collections; 21.)
King, Archdale A. & Pocknee, Cyril E. (1965). Eucharistic Reservation in the Western Church. New York: Sheed and Ward. 
Maffei, Edmond (1942) La réservation eucharistique jusqu'à la Renaissance. Brussels: Vromant
Raible, F. (1908) Der Tabernakel einst und jetzt: eine historische und liturgische Darstellung der Andacht zur aufbewahrten Eucharistie
Stone, Darwell (1917) The Reserved Sacrament (Handbooks of Catholic Faith and Practice.)
Timmermann, Achim (2009) Real Presence: Sacrament Houses and the Body of Christ, c. 1270–1600. Turnhout: Verlag Brepols Publishers NV

External links

Tabernacle article in the Catholic Encyclopedia at Newadvent.org
Tabernacle (liturgical) article in Orthodoxwiki.org

Christian religious objects
Eucharistic objects
Church architecture